Field Marshal William Edmund Ironside, 1st Baron Ironside,  (6 May 1880 – 22 September 1959) was a senior officer of the British Army who served as Chief of the Imperial General Staff during the first year of the Second World War.

Ironside joined the Royal Artillery in 1899, and served throughout the Second Boer War. This was followed by a brief period spying on the German colonial forces in South-West Africa. Returning to regular duty, he served on the staff of the 6th Infantry Division during the first two years of the First World War, before being appointed to a position on the staff of the newly raised 4th Canadian Division in 1916. In 1918, he was given command of a brigade on the Western Front. In 1919, he was promoted to command the Allied intervention force in northern Russia. Ironside was then assigned to an Allied force occupying Turkey, and then to the British forces based in Persia in 1921. He was offered the post of the commander of British forces in Iraq, but was unable to take up the role due to injuries in a flying accident.

He returned to the Army as Commandant of the Staff College, Camberley, where he advocated the ideas of J. F. C. Fuller, a proponent of mechanisation. He later commanded a division, and military districts in both Britain and India, but his youth and his blunt approach limited his career prospects, and after being passed over for the role of Chief of the Imperial General Staff (CIGS) in 1937 he became Governor of Gibraltar, a traditional staging post to retirement. He was recalled from "exile" in mid-1939, being appointed as Inspector-General of Overseas Forces, a role which led most observers to expect he would be given the command of the British Expeditionary Force (BEF) on the outbreak of war.

However, after some political manoeuvring, General Gort was given this command and Ironside was appointed as the new Chief of the Imperial General Staff. Ironside himself believed that he was temperamentally unsuited to the job, but felt obliged to accept it. In early 1940 he argued heavily for Allied intervention in Scandinavia, but this plan was shelved at the last minute when the Finnish-Soviet Winter War ended. During the invasion of Norway and the Battle of France he played little part; his involvement in the latter was limited by a breakdown in relations between him and Gort. He was replaced as CIGS at the end of May, and given a role to which he was more suited: Commander-in-Chief Home Forces, responsible for anti-invasion defences and for commanding the Army in the event of German landings. However, he served less than two months in this role before being replaced. After this, Ironside was promoted to Field Marshal and raised to the peerage as Baron Ironside.

Lord Ironside retired to Morley Old Hall in Norfolk to write, and never again saw active service or held any official position.

Early life
Ironside was born in Edinburgh, Scotland, on 6 May 1880. His father, Surgeon-Major William Ironside of the Royal Horse Artillery, died shortly afterwards, leaving his widowed wife to bring up their son on a limited military pension. As the cost of living in the late nineteenth century was substantially lower in mainland Europe than in Britain, she travelled extensively around the Continent, where the young Edmund began learning various foreign languages. This grasp of language would become one of the defining features of his character; by middle age, he was fluent enough to officially interpret in seven, and was proficient in perhaps ten more.

He was educated at schools in St Andrews before being sent to Tonbridge School in Kent for his secondary education; at the age of sixteen he left Tonbridge to attend a crammer, having not shown much academic promise, and was admitted to the Royal Military Academy, Woolwich, in January 1898 at the age of seventeen. At Woolwich he flourished, working hard at his studies and his sports; he took up boxing, and captained the rugby 2nd XV as well as playing for Scotland. He was built for both of these sports, six feet four inches tall and weighing seventeen stone (108 kg), for which he was nicknamed "Tiny" by his fellow students. The name stuck, and he was known by it for the rest of his life.

Boer War
After attending the Royal Military Academy, Woolwich he was commissioned into the army as a second lieutenant with the Royal Artillery on 25 June 1899. Later that year his unit, 44th Battery Royal Field Artillery, was despatched to South Africa. He fought throughout the Second Boer War being wounded three times, and was mentioned in despatches in 1901. He was also promoted lieutenant on 16 February 1901.

At the end of the war in May 1902, he was a member of the small force which escorted Jan Smuts to the peace negotiations. He then disguised himself as an Afrikaans-speaking Boer, taking a job as a wagon driver working for the German colonial forces in South West Africa. This intelligence work ended unsuccessfully when he was identified, but managed to escape. This escapade later led to claims that he became the model for Richard Hannay, a character in the novels of John Buchan; Ironside was always amused by these novels when reading about Mr Standfast in the implausibly romantic setting of the passenger seat of an open-cockpit biplane flying from Iraq to Persia. He left Cape Town on the HMT Britannic in early October 1902, and arrived at Southampton later the same month.

Ironside was subsequently posted to India, where he served with I Battery Royal Horse Artillery (RHA), and South Africa, with Y Battery RHA. He was promoted to captain in February 1908, appointed to the Staff in September of the same year, and then as a Brigade-Major in June 1909. He returned home in September 1912, in order to attend the Staff College, Camberley.

First World War

Ironside's two-year course at the Staff College, which he found unstimulating, was cut short by the outbreak of the First World War in August 1914; on 5 August, he was confirmed in his appointment as a Staff Captain, and assigned to Boulogne-sur-Mer and then St. Nazaire, both large Army bases supporting the British Expeditionary Force (BEF). By some accounts, he was one of the first British officers to arrive in France. He was promoted to Major and attached to the newly arrived 6th Division at the end of October 1914, ranked as a General Staff Officer, Grade 3 (GSO3).

He was promoted to temporary Lieutenant-Colonel and appointed GSO1 in March 1916. He had expected to be made GSO1 – Divisional Chief of Staff – to the 6th Division, but to his surprise he was assigned to the newly formed 4th Canadian Division. Ironside pushed for a hard training regime, intending to get the division to the front as quickly as possible and prevent it being broken up to feed reinforcements to the other three divisions of the Canadian Corps. Because of the inexperience of the divisional commander, Major-General David Watson – a volunteer soldier with little professional experience – he found himself almost commanding the division on occasions, noting in his memoirs that Watson regularly authorised Ironside's orders in his name. On its arrival in France in late 1916, the division participated at the end of the Battle of the Somme, before being moved north to prepare for the attack at Vimy Ridge. During the final phase of the fighting at Vimy, Ironside again was required to take unofficial command of the division, overruling an ambiguous order from Watson – who was out of contact at headquarters – to halt the attack, and personally ordering the leading battalions into action. 

He remained with the division through 1917, when it fought at the Battle of Passchendale, and in January 1918 was appointed to an administrative posting, as commandant of the Small Arms School, with the rank of acting Colonel. He quickly returned to the Western Front, however, when he was appointed to command 99th Brigade as temporary Brigadier-General at the end of March.

Russia and Iran

Ironside remained with 99th Brigade for only six months; in September 1918, he was attached to the Allied Expeditionary Force fighting the Bolsheviks in northern Russia, and in November given command of the force, retaining his temporary rank of Brigadier-General. This was his first independent command, and he threw himself fully into it; for over a year, he travelled continually along the Northern Dvina to keep control of his scattered international forces, at one point narrowly escaping assassination. However, the Red Army managed eventually to gain a superior position in the Civil War and in late 1919 he was forced to abandon the White Army to their fate. In November he handed command over to Henry Rawlinson, who would supervise the eventual withdrawal, and returned to Britain. Ironside was appointed a Knight Commander of the Order of the Bath, and promoted to substantive Major-General for his efforts; this made him one of the youngest Major-Generals in the British Army.

In early 1920 he commanded a military mission which supervised the withdrawal of Romanian Forces left in Hungary after the Hungarian–Romanian War of 1919, and in the summer was attached to the force occupying İzmit, Turkey, as it prepared to withdraw. His third overseas posting of the year was to Persia in late August, where – among other things – he appointed Reza Khan (after ousting the Russian officer Vsevolod Starosselsky and having his offered position declined by Sardar Homayoun) to command the élite Cossack Brigade; Reza Khan would later seize control of the country, and rule as Shah from 1925 to 1941. The precise level of British involvement in Reza Khan's coup remains a matter of historical debate, but it is almost certain that Ironside himself at least provided advice to the plotters. On his departure from Persia in 1921, the Shah awarded him the Order of the Lion and the Sun.

After Persia, he attended the Cairo Conference, where Winston Churchill persuaded him to take command of the newly reorganised British force in Iraq; however, returning to Persia in April, the aircraft he was flying in crashed and he was invalided home after several months in hospital.

Interwar period
After recovering from his injuries on half-pay, Ironside returned to active duty as Commandant of the Staff College in May 1922. He spent a full four-year term there, running the college efficiently as well as publishing several articles and a book on the Battle of Tannenberg. Most importantly for his future career, he became the mentor of J. F. C. Fuller, who was appointed a lecturer at the College at the same time, and became a close acquaintance of Sir Basil Liddell-Hart. Fuller's views were deeply influential on Ironside, who became a supporter of reforming the Army as an elite armoured force with air support, and of forming a single central Ministry of Defence to control the services. He argued frequently over the need for faster modernisation and rearmament, and the problem of the 'old men' still filling the upper ranks of the army; in the end, he was reprimanded by the Chief of the Imperial General Staff, Sir George Milne.

After Camberley he was appointed to command 2nd Division in England, a post he held for two years with little effect or interest – he was frustrated by the task of training an infantry force with no modern equipment – and then sent to command the Meerut district, in India, in 1928. He enjoyed life in India, but found the military situation to be equally uninteresting; the equipment was old-fashioned, as were the regimental officers and the overall strategic plans. He was promoted to Lieutenant-General in March 1931, and left for England in May, where he returned to half-pay with the sinecure of Lieutenant of the Tower of London. He was then posted to India as Quartermaster-General in 1933, where he travelled extensively, crossing the country to visit regiments and oversee the Indianisation process. For all this, however, it was the best of a bad job; he was still far from the War Office, and unable to make significant impact on the army's preparation for a future war.

Preparation for war
He returned home in 1936, recently promoted to full General, to lead Eastern Command, one of the corps-level regional commands in the United Kingdom, responsible for a single Regular division and three Territorial Army divisions. Here, he realised that a European War would come sooner rather than later, and that the Army was in a parlous state to defend the country. However, he found that as with his earlier posts, he could achieve little in Eastern Command – the most important decisions being made in Whitehall. He himself seemed to lose his opportunity for higher office in 1937, when he was rebuked over his mishandling of a mobile force in the annual exercises; until this point, he had been considered a possible candidate as Chief of the Imperial General Staff, but was dropped from consideration in favour of Lord Gort, whom Ironside considered unfit for the job. The Secretary of State for War, Leslie Hore-Belisha, gave him official notice that he was deemed too old for the post, aged 57. Thus, he was appointed an Aide-de-Camp to HM the King in October, a purely ceremonial position, and early in 1938 accepted the offer of Governor of Gibraltar, generally seen as a quiet role where to retire.

He was helped to accept Gibraltar by the suggestion that, in the event of war, he could be transferred to command the forces in the Middle East; as he believed no major force could usefully be sent to France, this seemed to him likely to be the main focus of British attention in the war. He took up the governorship in November 1938, and threw himself into preparing the colony for war; here, finally, he had free rein. Under his tenure, the defences were strengthened and the garrison prepared for a long siege.

In December 1938, only a month after he had taken up the post, Hore-Belisha had begun to consider the possibility of recalling Ironside to become Inspector-General of Overseas Forces. The position gave him overall responsibility for the readiness of forces based outside the United Kingdom, and many at the War Office worried that he might interpret this as a precursor to being given formal command of the Expeditionary Force on the outbreak of war. However, after some debate, Hore-Belisha went ahead and offered Ironside the position in May, appointing a corresponding Inspector-General of Home Forces at the same time, both under Lord Gort's command. The decision to recall Ironside may have been helped by the fact that Hore-Belisha was particularly reliant on the advice of Liddell Hart, an old acquaintance of Ironside's, who was already beginning to fall out with Gort.

As expected, Ironside chose to interpret the posting as indicating that he was the presumptive Commander-in-Chief, and soon began to clash with Lord Gort over their respective powers. Whilst Gort was nominally in the more senior position, Ironside had seniority of rank and a far more dominant personality, and had concluded several months earlier that Gort was "out of his depth" as CIGS; he is unlikely to have shown much deference. He held the post of Inspector for a few months, visiting Poland in July 1939 to meet with the Polish High Command. Whilst his sympathetic manner reassured the Poles, the visit may have unintentionally given the impression that Britain was intending to provide direct military assistance. He returned able to report that the Polish Government was unlikely to provoke Germany into war, but warned that the country would be quickly overrun and that no Eastern Front was likely to exist for long. His warnings, however, were broadly ignored.

Second World War

His appointment on 3 September 1939 as Chief of the Imperial General Staff (CIGS) came as something of a surprise to Ironside; he had been led to believe he would be appointed as the Commander-in-Chief of the British Expeditionary Force (BEF), and indeed had already despatched his Assistant to Aldershot to begin preparing his headquarters. The reorganisation was politically driven; Hore-Belisha had fallen out heavily with Viscount Gort during 1939, and the outbreak of war provided an excellent pretext for Gort to leave Whitehall. This left the post of CIGS vacant, and after heavy lobbying by Churchill, Ironside was chosen over Sir John Dill, then the General Officer Commanding, Aldershot Command.

As CIGS, Ironside adopted a policy of rapidly building up a strong force in France, aiming to put some twenty divisions in the field. However, this force would be broadly defensive, acting to support the French Army, and he aimed to influence the course of the war by forming a second strong force in the Middle East, which would be able to operate in peripheral operations in the Balkans. He strongly supported the development of a close-support air force, preferably under Army command, but at the same time argued that when a German offensive began in the West, the RAF should throw its main strength into strategic bombing of the Ruhr rather than attacking the forward units.

Norway

Ironside's enthusiasm for "peripheral" operations led him to plans for Allied intervention in Scandinavia; rather than the limited approach of simply mining Norwegian waters to stop Swedish iron-ore shipments to Germany, he argued for landing a strong force in northern Norway and physically occupying the Swedish orefields. If successful, this would allow the resupply of Finland – then fighting the Soviet Union, and aligned loosely with the Allied forces – as well as interdicting Germany's ore supply, and could potentially force Germany to commit troops on a new and geographically unfavourable front. Both Ironside and Churchill supported the plan enthusiastically, but it met with opposition from many other officers, including from Gort – who saw his forces in France being depleted of resources – and from Cyrill Newall, the Chief of the Air Staff.

Planning continued through the winter of 1939-1940, and by March 1940 a force of around three divisions was prepared to sail. On 12 March, however, Finland sued for peace, and the expedition had to be abandoned.

Following the German invasion of Norway in April 1940 as part of Operation Weserübung, the Norwegian Campaign of April–June 1940 saw significant British forces committed to action for the first time in the Second World War. Flaws in the command system quickly began to show. War Cabinet meetings dragged on at great length to little effect, as did meetings of the Chiefs of Staff, both to Ironside's great frustration. He also found it hard to cope with Churchill's mood swings and insistence on micromanagement of the campaign, and a gulf began to grow between the two. Ironside's main contribution to resolving the Norwegian campaign was to insist on a withdrawal when the situation worsened, and he pushed through the evacuation of central Norway at the end of April despite ministerial ambivalence.

Battle of France
Ironside himself was sent to France in May 1940 to liaise with the BEF and the French in an attempt to halt the German advance. He was not well-qualified for this task, having a deep dislike and distrust for the French, whom he considered "absolutely unscrupulous in everything". At a conference in Lens he clashed with the French Generals Billotte and Blanchard, whom he considered defeatists. He wrote: "I lost my temper and shook Billotte by the button of his tunic. The man is completely defeated." Although Billotte was supposed to be co-ordinating the British, French and Belgian armies' operations in Belgium, Ironside took over the job himself, ordering Gort and Blanchard to launch a counter-attack against the Germans at Arras. This attack achieved some local success, but the German onslaught proved unstoppable. The French Commander-in-Chief, General Maxime Weygand, so resented Ironside's actions that he said he would "like to box Ironside's ears." Ironside, despairing of the French Army's unwillingness to fight, accepted Gort's view that evacuation of the BEF was the only answer.

Home Defence
In his diary on the afternoon of 25 May, Ironside wrote that "I am now concentrating upon the Home Defence ... [The Cabinet] want(s) a change to some man well-known in England. They are considering my appointment". That night, he spoke to Churchill, offering to take up the new post, and – again from his diary:

His appointment as Commander-in-Chief, Home Forces was announced to the public on 27 May, succeeding Sir Walter Kirke. Ironside was succeeded as CIGS by his deputy, Sir John Dill. In his new command, Ironside commanded a force which amounted – on paper – to fifteen Territorial Infantry divisions, a single armoured division, fifty-seven home-defence battalions, and the Local Defence Volunteers (later the Home Guard). However, all of these were deficient in training and organisation, as the operational units had already been sent to France. They were also lacking in equipment; the force as a whole had almost no modern artillery or anti-tank guns, and the armoured division had just a small number of light tanks.

The deficiencies with equipment led to an overall lack of mobility, which coupled with the limited training of the units meant that very few were capable of organised offensive counter-attacks against an invading force. As a result, the only way they could practically be used would be to commit them to static defence; Ironside planned to steadily pull units away from the coast and into a central mobile reserve, but this was not possible until they were trained and equipped for the role. He threw himself into the details of the strategy, laying out plans for the static defence of village strongpoints by the Home Guard, patrols of "Ironsides" armoured cars to strengthen the divisions, and light artillery mounted on trucks as improvised tank destroyers.

He agreed to release two divisions for the Second BEF in early June, but was dubious about Churchill's decision to bring home troops from the Middle East and India; even after the fall of France and the potential collapse of the defences in Britain, he still held to his pre-war position that "[it] is essential to hold the East firmly, whatever happens here". By mid-June, he had begun to collect a scanty mobile reserve – the 8th RTR, with infantry tanks, and six regiments of armoured cars beginning to form – and the pillboxes and coastal defences were being prepared, though he emphasised to the local commanders that the latter "are only meant as delaying lines, and are meant to give the mobile columns a chance of coming up to the threatened points."

The fall of France led to a brief interlude where the Cabinet debated sending Ironside on a diplomatic mission to meet Charles Noguès, the French commander in North Africa and a personal acquaintance of Ironside's, but decided to retain him in Britain and send Lord Gort instead. On 25 June, he was called to the War Cabinet to brief them on the plans for Home Defence; his system of defence in depth provided for:

 A defensive "crust" along the coast, able to fight off small raids, give immediate warning of attack, and delay any landings.
 Home Guard roadblocks at crossroads, valleys, and other choke points, to stop German armoured columns penetrating inland.
 Static fortified stop lines sealing the Midlands and London off from the coast, and dividing the coastal area into defensible sectors
 A central corps-sized reserve to deal with a major breakthrough
 Local mobile columns to deal with local attacks and parachute landings

The plan was "on the whole" approved by the Cabinet, and by the Chiefs of Staff later in the week. He was clear in his diaries that he saw the static focus as an undesirable option – "[the] eternal preaching of the defensive and taking cover behind anti-tank articles has been the curse of our tactics" – but that it was the only practical way to make use of untrained and badly-equipped forces. By early July, he was optimistic that more troops could soon be pulled out of static positions and used in a mobile role, with the Home Guard taking over the local defences, but strongly resisted orders from Churchill to pull divisions out of the coastal areas before they could be effectively replaced.

However, criticism of the "Ironside plan" was soon manifest. On 26 June (only a day after the plan's approval) at a meeting of the Vice-Chiefs of Staff, Air Marshal Richard Peirse pointed out that many of the RAF's main operational airfields would be overrun by an invader before they reached Ironside's principal stop line, the "GHQ Line". The conclusion of the meeting was that the plan was "completely unsound". Although Ironside managed to placate the Chiefs of Staff, discontent amongst his subordinates was growing; one divisional commander wrote "We have become pill-box mad". There was widespread concern that troops were spending their time constructing defences rather than on the training which they desperately needed. Another critic was Major-General Bernard Montgomery, who later wrote that he found himself "in complete disagreement with the general approach to the defence of Britain and refused to apply it." When Churchill visited Montgomery's 3rd Infantry Division on 2 July, he described to the prime minister how his division, which was fully equipped except for transport, could be made into a mobile formation by the requisitioning of municipal buses, able to strike at the enemy beachheads rather than strung out along the coast as ordered. Ironside's credibility was not improved by his association with "Boney" Fuller, a senior member of the British Union of Fascists. Finally, on 17 July, Churchill had a long drive with Lieutenant-General Alan Brooke, the commander of Southern Command, whose views on creating mobile reserves held close to possible landing sites were in accordance with his own.

On 19 July, Ironside was summoned to the War Office and informed that he was to be replaced by Brooke as C-in-C Home Forces, effective immediately. The formal reason was that the Cabinet wished to have someone with recent combat experience in command, and Ironside accepted the dismissal gracefully – "I was quite prepared to be released. I had done my best ... I can't complain. Cabinets have to make decisions in times of stress. I don't suppose that Winston liked doing it, for he is always loyal to his friends." On his arrival at Home Forces HQ, Brooke was astonished that Ironside had not stayed to apprise him of the situation; neither had he left him any notes except for a brief memo to say that he had arranged for Brooke to use his staff car.

Retirement and writing
At the end of August, a month and a half after his resignation as Commander-in-Chief of Home Forces, Ironside was appointed a field marshal. He was raised to the peerage in the New Year Honours, on 29 January 1941, as "Baron Ironside of Archangel and of Ironside in the County of Aberdeen", and retired to Morley Old Hall in Norfolk with his family. He never received another military posting, and ostracised by the Army establishment, rarely visited London, and never spoke in the House of Lords.

He turned to lecturing and writing books, including a study of the Archangel expedition, and farming his estates in Norfolk. After almost two decades in retirement, having survived a driving accident, he was injured in a fall at his home; he was taken to Queen Alexandra Military Hospital in London where he died on 22 September 1959, aged 79. His coffin was escorted to Westminster Abbey with full military honours, and he was buried near his home at Hingham, Norfolk. He is commemorated by a memorial plaque in the crypt of St Paul's Cathedral.

Ironside kept a diary throughout his life, starting as a subaltern at the turn of the century, with the goal of keeping a clear recollection of what had happened during the day and allowing him to reflect on the day's events. These were written directly into bound foolscap volumes, a page or more a day, each night; throughout his life, he totalled some twelve volumes and the best part of a million words. He did not ask for these to be destroyed on his death, though their content was sometimes quite contentious, but did write a will – in 1930 – asking that they not be published. In the late 1950s, however, a former colleague persuaded him to allow extracts to be published as part of an account of the run-up to the Second World War, although he died shortly before it saw print. This was published as The Ironside Diaries: 1937–1940, edited by Colonel Roderick Macleod and Denis Kelly, in 1962; the material was selected from May 1937 to his retirement in June 1940, and published as numbered daily entries with editorial notes.

A second volume, High Road to Command: the diaries of Major-General Sir Edmund Ironside, 1920–1922, was published in 1972, edited by his son; this covered the period from 1920 to 1922, during his service in the Middle East. The book was assembled by Ironside shortly before his death and, whilst it drew heavily on the diaries, it was written in a more conventional narrative form rather than as a strict day-by-day account, with editorial remarks kept to a minimum.

Honours

Ribbon bar:

Knight Grand Cross of the Order of the Bath (GCB) in the 1938 King's Birthday Honours (9 June 1938); (KCB: 1 August 1919)
Companion of the Order of St Michael and St George (CMG) on 1 January 1918.
Companion of the Distinguished Service Order (DSO) in the 1915 King's Birthday Honours (23 June 1915).
Knight of the Most Venerable Order of Saint John in June 1939.
Mentioned in despatches (10 September 1901, 4 December 1914, 22 June 1915, 15 June 1916, 15 May 1917, 11 December 1917, 20 December 1918, 21 May 1920)
Queen's South Africa Medal (clasps: Cape Colony, Orange Free State, Transvaal)
King's South Africa Medal (clasps: South Africa 1901, South Africa 1902)
1914 Star
British War Medal
Victory Medal 
General Service Medal (1918) North-West Persia Clasp
Virtuti Militari (Poland)
Cross of St. George (Russia)
Knight of the Order of St Anna (Russia)
Order of the Lion and the Sun (Persia, 1921)
Order of the Rising Sun, 3rd Class (6 February 1922, Japan).
Grand Croix de la Légion d'Honneur in 1946 (France), previously Officier.
Croix de Guerre avec Palme (France).
Order of St. Vladimir (Russia)
Baron Ironside of Archangel and of Ironside in the County of Aberdeen, in the 1941 New Year Honours (29 January 1941).

Notes

Bibliography

Articles

Primary and secondary sources
Official despatches
Operations carried out by the Allied Forces under my Command during the period from 1 October 1918, to 11 August 1919
in 
 Operations carried out by the Allied Forces under my Command during the period from 11 August 1919, to 27 September 1919.
in 

Books
 
 
 
 
 
 
 
 
 
 
 
 
 
 

Other

External links
British Army Officers 1939−1945
Generals of World War II
www.burkespeerage.com

 

1880 births
1959 deaths
Military personnel from Edinburgh
People educated at Tonbridge School
Graduates of the Royal Military Academy, Woolwich
Graduates of the Staff College, Camberley
Royal Artillery officers
Allied intervention in the Russian Civil War
British Army generals of World War I
British field marshals of World War II
Scottish soldiers
Scottish diarists
British spies
Chiefs of the Imperial General Staff
Knights Grand Cross of the Order of the Bath
Companions of the Order of St Michael and St George
Companions of the Distinguished Service Order
Knights of the Order of St John
Recipients of the Croix de Guerre (France)
Recipients of the Order of the Rising Sun, 3rd class
Grand Croix of the Légion d'honneur
Recipients of the Virtuti Militari
Recipients of the Cross of St. George
Recipients of the Order of St. Vladimir
British Army personnel of the Second Boer War
British Army personnel of the Russian Civil War
British Empire in World War II
Burials in Norfolk
War Office personnel in World War II
Commandants of the Staff College, Camberley
Barons created by George VI